Kalanchoe sexangularis, also known as bushveld kalanchoe, six-angled kalanchoe, or red-leaved kalanchoe, is a species of the succulent genus Kalanchoe, in the family Crassulaceae that is native to Southern Africa.

Description

Kalanchoe sexangularis is a succulent, perennial  that reaches heights of 20 to 100 centimeters. Its single or few, simple, upright, round, reddish shoots are somewhat two-to-six-sided and arise from a woody base. The fleshy leaves are more or less stalked. The rutty petiole is 4 to 45 millimeters long. On the lower leaves it does not encompass the stem, but on the upper leaves it is clearly encompassing the stem. 

The broadly elliptical, elongated or egg-shaped, green to deep ruby-red (in full sun) leaf blade is 5 to 13 inches long and 3 to 8 inches wide. Their tip is rounded or blunt. The base of the lower leaves is heart-shaped, that of the upper is wedge-shaped. The leaf margin is roughly notched or wavy-notched or with one to four bluntly toothed lobes.

Inflorescences
A winter-bloomer, its inflorescence consists of flat-topped panicles up to 30 centimeters in length. The upright, green-yellow to bright yellow flowers are on 2 to 7 millimeter long peduncles. 

The green calyx tube is 0.5 to 2 millimeters long. The triangular, pointed calyx lobes are 1.5 to 2.2 millimeters long and about 1.2 millimeters wide. The pale pink, square-cylindrical to almost pyramidal corolla tube is enlarged in the lower half and 8 to 13 millimeters long. Their salmon-colored, broadly egg-shaped to almost circular corolla lobes are narrowed or rounded at their tip and have a length of 2 to 4 millimeters and are 1.5 to 3 millimeters wide. The stamens are attached to the tip of the corolla tube. Upper stamens protrude from the flower. The almost circular anthers are 0.4 to 1 millimeter long. The linear-lanceolate, pointed nectar flakes are 1.6 to 4 millimeters long. The carpel has a length of 6.5 to 10 millimeters. The stylus is 1.7 to 4 millimeters long.

The seeds reach a length of 1 to 1.3 millimeters.

Distribution
Kalanchoe sexangularis is common in Zimbabwe, Mozambique and South Africa on rocky slopes in the shade or partial shade of trees or shrubs in bushland.

See also
Kalanchoe longiflora

References

Garden plants
sexangularis
Plants described in 1913
Flora of Zimbabwe
Flora of South Africa
Flora of Mozambique
Taxa named by N. E. Brown